Jaruco Municipal Museum is a museum located in the 32nd street in Jaruco, Cuba. It was established on 30 December 1980.

The museum holds collections on history, weaponry, decorative arts and numismatics.

See also 
 List of museums in Cuba

References 

Museums in Cuba
Buildings and structures in Mayabeque Province
Museums established in 1980
1980 establishments in Cuba
20th-century architecture in Cuba